Claude Patrick (born June 14, 1980) is a Canadian retired mixed martial artist. Patrick most recently competed in the Ultimate Fighting Championship (UFC), fighting in their Welterweight division.

Early life
Claude Patrick was born and raised in Mississauga, Ontario, just outside Toronto. His parents are from Jamaica. Patrick's martial arts journey started with karate at the age of thirteen. His parents signed him up for three months, then he took up Muay Thai and jiu-jitsu, and has been using those styles ever since. He went to school at  Port Credit Secondary School in Mississauga.

Mixed martial arts
Patrick made his professional debut in 2002. He has fought for smaller promotions including King of the Cage Canada, The Fight Club and the International Fight League. In 2006 he moved to Montreal, Quebec for 8 months to train with Georges St-Pierre. Before signing with the UFC, he amassed a career of 11 wins and 1 loss.

Ultimate Fighting Championship
In March 2010, the UFC announced it had signed Patrick to a four-fight contract.

He made his UFC debut on against Ricardo Funch on June 12, 2010 at UFC 115. In the second round, Patrick submitted his opponent with a guillotine choke.

Patrick next defeated  TUF 9 winner James Wilks via unanimous decision at UFC 120 on October 16, 2010.

Patrick faced Daniel Roberts on April 30, 2011 at UFC 129. Patrick won via unanimous decision in a close fight after winning the first two rounds.

Patrick replaced an injured Rory MacDonald at UFC 140 and faced Brian Ebersole, losing for the first time in the UFC via split decision.

Patrick was expected to face James Head on July 21, 2012 at UFC 149. However, Patrick was forced out of the bout with an injury and replaced by Brian Ebersole.

After not stepping into the octagon for two years, Patrick was finally healthy and looking for a spot on the UFC 174 card in Vancouver, British Columbia. However, Patrick never had a fight scheduled for the event.

Personal life
Patrick hails from Mississauga, Ontario. He trains with UFC fighters Mark Bocek and Sean Pierson and co-owns the a BJJ & Mixed Martial Arts Academy  in Mississauga.

Patrick was the victim of a highly publicized taser gun attack following an MMA event in Gatineau, Quebec. He woke up two days later in the hospital after doctors put him in a medically induced coma. He states that he has no recollection of the attack.

Championship and accomplishments

Mixed martial arts
The Fight Club
TFC Canadian Welterweight Championship (One time)

Mixed martial arts record

|-
| Loss
|align=center| 14–2
|Brian Ebersole
| Decision (split)
| UFC 140
| 
|align=center| 3
|align=center| 5:00
|Toronto, Ontario, Canada
| 
|-
| Win
|align=center| 14–1
|Daniel Roberts
| Decision (unanimous)
| UFC 129
| 
|align=center| 3
|align=center| 5:00
|Toronto, Ontario, Canada
| 
|-
| Win
|align=center| 13–1
|James Wilks
| Decision (unanimous)
| UFC 120
| 
|align=center| 3
|align=center| 5:00
|London, England
| 
|-
| Win
|align=center| 12–1
|Ricardo Funch
| Submission (guillotine choke)
| UFC 115
| 
|align=center| 2
|align=center| 1:48
|Vancouver, British Columbia, Canada
| 
|-
| Win
|align=center| 11–1
|Matt MacGrath
| Submission (guillotine choke)
| AMMA 2: Vengeance
| 
|align=center| 3
|align=center| 2:29
|Edmonton, Alberta, Canada
| 
|-
| Win
|align=center| 10–1
|Daniel Grandmaison
| Submission (guillotine choke)
| Canadian Fighting Championship 3
| 
|align=center| 1
|align=center| 2:42
|Winnipeg, Manitoba, Canada
| 
|-
| Win
|align=center| 9–1
|Dave Mazany
| TKO (punches)
| TFC 6: Domination
| 
|align=center| 2
|align=center| 2:27
|Edmonton, Alberta, Canada
| 
|-
| Win
|align=center| 8–1
|Victor Bachmann
| Submission (guillotine choke)
| TFC 5: Armageddon
| 
|align=center| 1
|align=center| 4:48
|Edmonton, Alberta, Canada
| 
|-
| Win
|align=center| 7–1
|Dan Chambers
| Submission (north-south choke)
| TFC 3: This Means War
| 
|align=center| 1
|align=center| 0:51
|Edmonton, Alberta, Canada
| 
|-
| Win
|align=center| 6–1
|Ray Steinbeiss
| Submission (guillotine choke)
| 2006 International Fight League
| 
|align=center| 1
|align=center| 3:12
|Moline, Illinois, United States
| 
|-
| Win
|align=center| 5–1
|Neil Berry
| Submission (rear-naked choke)
| King of the Cage: Widowmaker
| 
|align=center| 1
|align=center| N/A
|Edmonton, Alberta, Canada
| 
|-
| Win
|align=center| 4–1
|Chris Peak
| Submission (guillotine choke)
| King of the Cage: Karnage
| 
|align=center| 1
|align=center| 1:31
|Calgary, Alberta, Canada
| 
|-
| Win
|align=center| 3–1
|Mandela Kponou
| Submission (rear-naked choke)
| APEX: Undisputed
| 
|align=center| 1
|align=center| 3:26
|Montreal, Quebec, Canada
| 
|-
| Win
|align=center| 2–1
|Marcus Celestin
| TKO (knees)
| Ultimate Generation Combat 10
| 
|align=center| 1
|align=center| 2:55
|Quebec, Canada
| 
|-
| Loss
|align=center| 1–1
|Drew McFedries
| Decision (unanimous)
| UCC 10: Battle for the Belts 2002
| 
|align=center| 3
|align=center| 5:00
|Quebec, Canada
| 
|-
| Win
|align=center| 1–0
|Guillaume Desrosiers
| TKO (punches)
| UCC 8: Fast and Furious
| 
|align=center| 1
|align=center| 2:06
|Rimouski, Quebec, Canada
|

See also
 List of current UFC fighters
 List of male mixed martial artists
 List of Canadian UFC fighters

References

External links
UFC Profile
Elite Training Center
Claude's Official Jiu-jitsu site

1980 births
Living people
Canadian male mixed martial artists
Black Canadian mixed martial artists
Canadian practitioners of Brazilian jiu-jitsu
People awarded a black belt in Brazilian jiu-jitsu
Canadian people of Jamaican descent
Sportspeople from Mississauga
Welterweight mixed martial artists
Ultimate Fighting Championship male fighters